Gepard, meaning "cheetah" in a number of languages, may refer to:

 Flakpanzer Gepard, a German self-propelled anti-aircraft gun
 Flakpanzer 38(t), German self-propelled anti-aircraft gun used in World War II
 Gepárd anti-materiel rifle, a family of Hungarian heavy sniper rifles
 Gepard-class frigate, a class of frigates built in Russia
 Gepard-class fast attack craft, a class of patrol vessels built for the German Navy
 Gepard (K-335), a Russian Navy Akula III-class submarine
 Gepard (game engine), a real-time strategy video game engine